Rescue Me (also known as Street Hunter) is a 1992  American coming-of-age adventure action film directed by Arthur Allan Seidelman and starring  Stephen Dorff and Michael Dudikoff.

Plot
A girl (Ami Dolenz) is kidnapped by two men, and Daniel and Fraser go after the kidnappers. The kidnappers hold her hostage inside the house until she climbs out the bathroom window and escapes the kidnappers.

Cast 
 
 Stephen Dorff as Fraser Sweeney
 Michael Dudikoff as Daniel "Mac" MacDonald
 William Lucking as Kurt
 Peter DeLuise as  Rowdy
 Ami Dolenz as Ginny Grafton
 Dee Wallace as Sarah Sweeney
 Liz Torres as Carney
 Danny Nucci as Todd
 Ty Hardin as Sheriff Gilbert 
 Kimberley Kates as Cindy 
 Caroline Schlitt as Dawn Johnson 
 Jason Kristofer as Billy
 Samantha Phillips as Cherrie

References

External links 

Golan-Globus films
1990s action adventure films
Films directed by Arthur Allan Seidelman
American action adventure films
1990s English-language films
1990s American films